Afzal Hossain (born 19 July 1954) is a Bangladeshi actor, director, writer and painter.

Early life
Hossain was born in Parulia, Satkhira in erstwhile East Bengal. His father, Ali Ashraf Hossain, was a medical officer. He has one brother Alfaz Hossain and sister Rumana Afroz. Hossain is married to Tazeen Halim Mona.

Career
Hossain started his acting career in theatrical productions in the mid-1970s. Later, he was enlisted as an actor of BTV and acted in dramas produced by BTV. He also starred in three movies including box office hit Dui Jibon, Notun Bou and Palabi Kothay. Since 1984, he became busy with making TVC and has contributed a lot in this sector to develop in today's level. On 22 January 2022, Hossain was awarded the Ekushey Padak, the second most important award for civilians in Bangladesh.

Works

Television

Films

Web series

References

External links

 

1954 births
Living people
Bangladeshi male film actors
Bangladeshi male television actors
People from Khulna
People from Khulna Division
Recipients of the Ekushey Padak